John-John Dominique Dohmen (born 24 January 1988) is a Belgian field hockey player who plays for Orée and the Belgium national team as a midfielder.

Biography
John-John Dohmen was born in Anderlecht in 1988, and spent his youth in Ittre.

He has graduated in ergotherapy. In 2014, he was a candidate for the Centre démocrate humaniste in the Belgian regional elections in Walloon Brabant.

Dohmen started playing hockey when he was five years old, and debuted at Royal Léopold Club in Uccle.

He was a player for the Waterloo Ducks until 2020, and since 2013, the captain of the Belgian national team (the "Red Lions"). He has won five national titles, one with Léopold and four with Waterloo. He was named Belgian hockey player of the year for the season 2008–2009. In the 2018–19 Euro Hockey League, Dohmen's Waterloo Ducks became the first Belgian club to win the Euro Hockey League.

International career
Dohmen debuted with the national team when he was only 16 years old, in a match against Italy. As of 23 February 2017, he had played 338 matches for the Red Lions.

He participated in his first Olympics at the 2008 Summer Olympics and the 2012 Summer Olympics. Dohmen became European vice-champion with Belgium at the 2013 European Championship on home ground in Boom.

Olympic silver medalist
In his third Olympics, Rio 2016, Dohmen led his team to the silver medal in the men's field hockey tournament.

World hockey player of the year
At the 2016 FIH Player of the Year Awards, the main awards given by the International Hockey Federation, Dohmen was crowned the 2016 FIH Player of the Year. He was previously nominated for the same award in 2013 and 2015.

Awards
2009: Belgian hockey player of the year
2016: Officer in the Order of Walloon Merit
2017: FIH Player of the Year 2016 at the FIH Player of the Year Awards

References

External links
 
  (archive)

1988 births
Living people
Belgian male field hockey players
Male field hockey midfielders
Field hockey players at the 2008 Summer Olympics
Field hockey players at the 2012 Summer Olympics
2014 Men's Hockey World Cup players
Field hockey players at the 2016 Summer Olympics
Field hockey players at the 2020 Summer Olympics
2018 Men's Hockey World Cup players
People from Anderlecht
Olympic field hockey players of Belgium
Olympic silver medalists for Belgium
Olympic medalists in field hockey
Medalists at the 2016 Summer Olympics
Waterloo Ducks H.C. players
Men's Belgian Hockey League players
Royal Léopold Club players
Olympic gold medalists for Belgium
Medalists at the 2020 Summer Olympics
Field hockey players from Brussels
2023 Men's FIH Hockey World Cup players